Bricktown station is a Detroit People Mover station in Downtown Detroit, Michigan. It is located on Beaubien Street, just north of Congress Street.  The station takes its name from the Bricktown Historic District.  It also serves the nearby Wayne County Building and various restaurants and nightlife in the area.

The People Mover shut down temporarily on March 30, 2020, due to decreased ridership amid the COVID-19 pandemic. Following the system's May 2022 restart, the station reopened on November 21, 2022.

See also

 List of rapid transit systems
 List of United States rapid transit systems by ridership
 Metromover
 Transportation in metropolitan Detroit

References

External links
DPM station overview
entrance from Google Maps Street View

Detroit People Mover stations
Railway stations in the United States opened in 1987
1987 establishments in Michigan